Delang railway station is a railway station on the East Coast Railway network in the state of Odisha, India. It serves Delang town. Its code is DEG. It has three platforms. Passenger, MEMU, Express trains halt at Delang railway station.

Major trains

 Puri–Barbil Express
 Howrah–Puri Express
 Paradeep−Puri Intercity Express

See also
 Puri district

References

Railway stations in Puri district
Khurda Road railway division